Slackia faecicanis  is a Gram-positive, non-spore-forming and rod-shaped bacterium from the genus of Slackia which has been isolated from faeces of a dog from England.

References

 

Bacteria described in 2005
Actinomycetota